The Illinois Aviation Museum at Bolingbrook is a museum of global aviation history and heritage.  It is located in Hangar One, a  enclosed facility at Clow International Airport in Bolingbrook in the U.S. state of Illinois.  Aircraft in the Museum's collection include machines from World War I and the Cold War period.  Flying craft made in France, Germany, and the United States are represented.  As of 2017, the museum is open on Saturdays only.

References

Aerospace museums in Illinois
Bolingbrook, Illinois
Museums in Will County, Illinois